Aaron Michael Esmonde (born 20 August 1977, Swansea, Wales) is a horror, scifi and fantasy novelist, director and producer. The vampire horror novel Blood Hunger (2010) was his first work to be published, followed by the popular zombie novel Dead Pulse. Both ebook editions ranked in the top 100 (free) horror and fantasy charts, Blood Hunger position #13 with Dead Pulse reaching #39. In May 2014 his third novel The Final Version a science fiction thriller was released, with the free ebook ranking at #12 in the USA science fiction cyber punk chart on 31 August 2014 and #42 in the UK dystopian science fiction chart on 30 August 2014. Darkest Moons a horror thriller was released 29 October 2016 and peaked at #7 in the UK occult horror chart 2 April 2019 and in the top 100 USA occult chart. In October 2020 paranormal, supernatural mystery Skeletons in their Closets entered the top 100 ghost thriller  chart USA and UK Ghost Horror  ebook chart. In 2021 he released ‘Shadows of Dismemberment.’  in January 2022 he announced on his social media channels that due to encephalitis it may be his last novel. 

A. M. Esmonde was also a producer on the film Terminus (2010), which was directed by Sean P. Parsons, and acts as a prelude story to the Blood Hunger novel. He also produced the related short Revamped (2009). In 2013, he became an associate producer of 'Call Girl' the first film in David P. Baker's 'City of Sin' and the 'Crime Lord' TV series. Also, 2013 saw him direct a revenge themed music video, 'Say My Name', for the UK’s top ten album selling rock band Scarlet Rebles(formerly V0iD). In 2023 he executive produced ‘Mad World.’

References

External links
 
 Zombie Hub
  The Longest Night 
  City of Sin World
  V0iD

Living people
1977 births
21st-century British novelists